Ocneropsis is a genus of grasshoppers belonging to the family Pamphagidae.

The species of this genus are found in Middle East.

Species:

Ocneropsis bethlehemita

References

Pamphagidae
Caelifera genera